Monoarthritis is inflammation (arthritis) of one joint at a time. It is usually caused by trauma, infection, or crystalline  arthritis.

Causes

Septic arthritis
Septic arthritis is due to a bacterial infection to the joint. It requires urgent joint washout in the operating room followed by intravenous antibiotic therapy for large joints. Small joints or children can be treated with repeated aspirations and intravenous antibiotics.

Gout
In gout, the acute inflammatory arthritis is caused by excess uric acid caused by either overproduction or under-excretion. Before the age of menopause, women have a lower incidence than males, but the rates are equal above this age. Gout can cause mono- or polyarthritis, but usually results in monoarthritis first.

Pseudogout
When monoarthritis is caused by pseudogout (calcium pyrophosphate deposition disease, CPPD), the inflammation usually lasts days to weeks, and involves the knees in half of all attacks. Like gout, attacks can occur spontaneously or with physical trauma or metabolic stress. Patients may feel well in between pseudogout attacks, and 5% present with pseudo-rheumatoid symptoms.

Osteoarthritis
Osteoarthritis is a degenerative disease commonly involving the knees and hips. It results from erosion of the cartilage protecting the bones from rubbing together. Osteoarthritis is, in fact, a polyarthritis, but it starts initially in one joint before the involvement of other joints, hence, mimicking monoarthritis.

Psoriatic arthritis
Occurs in 5-10% of patients who have psoriasis. Classic presentation involves the DIP(distal interphalangeal joints). Morning stiffness is present. Deformity of involved joints, dactylitis and nail involvement are common. Well demarcated red plaques with silvery scaling - the classic lesions of psoriasis are seen on the dorsum of the hand.

Diagnosis
When faced with monoarthritis, one of the main decisions to make is whether to perform a joint aspirate by inserting a needle into the affected joint and removing some fluid for microscopic analysis. This decision is largely taken on inflammatory markers in blood tests (e.g. CRP), fever and the clinical picture. The main use of aspiration is to detect bacteria and neutrophil granulocytes (in septic arthritis) and crystals (crystal arthropathies).

Treatment

See also
 Gout
 Pseudogout
 Septic arthritis
 Osteoarthritis

References

External links 

Arthritis